HMS Duncan, launched in 1957, was the fifth RN ship named after Admiral Adam Duncan.

Service
From her first commissioning in 1958 until 1965 Duncan was the leader of the Fishery Protection Squadron. She was involved in the First Cod War between United Kingdom and Iceland over fishing rights, intervening between the Icelandic coastguard and British trawlers.

She was an escort to the royal yacht  in August 1960. Between 1960 and 1962 her captain was George Cunningham Leslie. From 1962 until 1964 her captain was Richard Trowbridge, who was later promoted to Rear Admiral and served as Flag Officer, Royal Yachts from 1970 until 1975, and in retirement as Governor of Western Australia from 1980 to 1983.

In 1964 Duncan fired the salute at the opening of the new Forth Road Bridge. She was given the Freedom of the city of Hull for the part the vessel played in the Cod Wars. In 1966 she completed a long refit and modernisation of all her sonar and anti-submarine equipment at Rosyth Naval Dockyard, and then became employed mainly in anti-submarine training duties, first in the Londonderry Squadron and then from 1969 in the Portland Training Squadron. In 1967 she attended Portsmouth Navy Days.

Sir Robin Knox-Johnson, who in 1968 was the first person to perform a single-handed non-stop circumnavigation of the Earth while also winning the Sunday Times Golden Globe Race, was a watch-keeping and communications officer on Duncan from January to April of that year.

In 1970 Duncan was again present at Portsmouth Navy Days, as part of the Portland Training Squadron. On 2 April 1971, Duncan paid off from the Portland Training Squadron.

During the early 1980s, Duncan served alongside the frigate  as harbour training ship at Rosyth Dockyard for the marine engineering artificer apprentices from the shore base HMS Caledonia.

References

Publications

 

Blackwood-class frigates
1957 ships
Ships of the Fishery Protection Squadron of the United Kingdom
Ships built by John I. Thornycroft & Company